Professor Sambo Wali Junaidu is a scholar of Islam and Arabic Literature. He is the 13th Wazirin Sokoto and chairman of the Advisory Committee on Religious Affairs, Sokoto Sultanate Council. He was formerly a lecturer at the Department of Arabic Studies of Usmanu Danfodiyo University, Sokoto, and the chairman of the Moon Sighting & Advisory Committee to the Sultanate Council. He succeeded his older brother Alhaji Usman Junaidu, the 12th Wazirin Sokoto, who died in 2017.

References 

Living people
Year of birth missing (living people)
Islamic studies scholars
Academic staff of Usmanu Danfodiyo University